Mesothen nomia is a moth of the subfamily Arctiinae. It was described by Herbert Druce in 1900. It is found in Colombia.

References

 

Mesothen (moth)
Moths described in 1900